The 2021 Copa América was an international football tournament held in Brazil from 13 June to 10 July 2021. The ten national teams involved in the tournament were required to register a squad of up to 28 players, including at least three goalkeepers, an increase over the usual number of 23 players allowed. Only players in these squads were eligible to take part in the tournament.

On 22 March 2021, during a virtual meeting of its Council, CONMEBOL confirmed adjustments in the tournament regulations, several of these related to the player rosters, taking into account the conditions imposed by the COVID-19 pandemic.

Initially the ten national teams were required to register a provisional list with up to fifty players and then a final list of 23 players. However, on 28 May 2021, CONMEBOL decided to increase the provisional list up to sixty players and the final list up to 28 players at the request of some national associations. Each national team had to submit its provisional list of up to fifty players to CONMEBOL by 27 April 2021, 18:00 PYT (UTC−4) (Regulations Article 25) and could also register up to ten additional players until 1 June. Taking into consideration the fact that matchdays 7 and 8 of CONMEBOL's FIFA World Cup qualifiers were played only a few days before the start of the tournament, the final list of up to 28 players per national team could be submitted to CONMEBOL by 10 June 2021, 12:00 PYT (UTC−4), three days prior to the opening match of the tournament. All players in the final selection must not have been excluded from the provisional list (Regulations Article 27).

Despite the increase of players in the final lists, teams could still only name a maximum of 23 players on the match list for each tournament fixture (of which twelve were substitutes).

Once the final lists were registered, teams were only permitted to make replacements in cases of serious injuries up to 24 hours before their first match. Teams were also permitted to replace an injured goalkeeper with another at any time during the tournament (Regulations Article 28). In addition, any player with positive PCR tests for SARS-CoV-2 could be replaced before and during the tournament (Regulations Article 30). All substitutes had to have the approval of the CONMEBOL Medical Commission and the replacement players did not need to be in the provisional list.

Before starting the final stage of the tournament, teams were able to replace a total of three players from their final list, with the replacement players coming from the provisional list (Regulations Article 29).

The final lists were published by CONMEBOL on 10 June 2021.

The age listed for each player is as of 13 June 2021, the first day of the tournament. The numbers of caps and goals listed for each player do not include any matches played after the start of the tournament. A flag is included for coaches who are of a different nationality than their own national team.

Group A

Argentina
Head coach: Lionel Scaloni

Argentina announced their final squad of 28 players on 11 June 2021. A provisional list was not revealed.

Bolivia
Head coach:  César Farías

Bolivia announced their final squad of 27 players on 10 June 2021. A provisional list was not revealed.

Uruguay
Head coach: Óscar Tabárez

Uruguay announced their final squad of 26 players on 10 June 2021. A provisional list was not revealed.

Chile
Head coach:  Martín Lasarte

Chile announced their final squad of 28 players on 10 June 2021. A provisional list was not revealed. After the team's last group stage match, defender Guillermo Maripán withdrew injured and was replaced by Diego Valencia on 27 June.

Paraguay
Head coach:  Eduardo Berizzo

Paraguay announced their final squad of 28 players on 10 June 2021. A provisional list was not revealed.

Group B

Brazil
Head coach: Tite

Brazil announced their final squad of 24 players on 9 June 2021. A provisional list was not revealed. After the team's second group stage match, defender Felipe withdrew injured and was replaced by Léo Ortiz on 26 June.

Colombia
Head coach: Reinaldo Rueda

Colombia announced their final squad of 28 players on 10 June 2021. A provisional list was not revealed. After the team's first match, Yairo Moreno left the squad on 13 June due to injury. Juan Ferney Otero tested positive for SARS-CoV-2 and was replaced by Frank Fabra on 15 June.

Venezuela
Head coach:  José Peseiro

Venezuela's 49-man provisional list was announced on 12 and 13 May 2021. The final squad of 28 players was announced on 10 June 2021. On 12 June 2021, CONMEBOL and the Venezuelan Football Federation reported that eleven members of its delegation, eight of them footballers, had tested positive for SARS-CoV-2. Consequently, fifteen additional players were called up to join the squad. Midfielder and captain Tomás Rincón and goalkeeper Rafael Romo tested positive for SARS-CoV-2 and were replaced by Francisco La Mantía and Luis Romero respectively on 12 June. After the team's first match, defender Jhon Chancellor and midfielder Jhon Murillo tested positive for SARS-CoV-2 and were replaced by José Manuel Velázquez and Jan Carlos Hurtado respectively.

Ecuador
Head coach:  Gustavo Alfaro

Ecuador announced their final squad of 28 players on 9 June 2021. A provisional list was not revealed. After the team's last group stage match, midfielder Damián Díaz withdrew after testing positive for SARS-CoV-2 and was replaced by Carlos Gruezo on 29 June.

Peru
Head coach:  Ricardo Gareca

Peru's 50-man provisional list was announced on 27 April 2021, and was expanded to 60 players on 1 June 2021. The final squad of 26 players was announced on 10 June 2021.

Statistics

Age
All ages are set to 13 June 2021, the opening day of the tournament.

Players
Oldest:  Claudio Bravo
Youngest:  Julio Enciso

Goalkeepers
Oldest:  Claudio Bravo
Youngest:  Rubén Cordano

Captains
Oldest:  Claudio Bravo
Youngest:  Gustavo Gómez

Player representation

By club
Clubs are ordered alphabetically: first by country, then by club name.

By club nationality
Nations in bold are represented by their national teams in the tournament.

By club confederation

References

2021
squads